The SAB-SEMA 10 was a single-engine advanced trainer, designed and built in France as the SEMA 10, in the 1930s.  It failed to win a French production contract and only one was built. Re-engined, modified and redesignated SAB-SEMA 12, it served with the Spanish Republican Air Force at the beginning of the Spanish Civil War.

Design and development

The SAB-SEMA 10 was designed by the Societé d'Etudes de Materiel d'Aviation (SEMA) and built by the Société Aérienne Bordelaise (SAB) to compete for a 1933 French government contract for an intermediate and advanced military trainer.  It was a conventional biplane, metal framed and fabric covered, powered by a 240 hp (180 kW) Lorraine 7Mc Mizar seven-cylinder radial engine. Instructor and pupil occupied open tandem cockpits.

The SAB-SEMA 10 failed to gain a production contract when the competition was won by the Romano R.82. It was then re-engined with a more powerful 300 hp (224 kW) Lorraine 9Na Algol nine-cylinder radial with a Townend ring cowling.  At the same time wing and tail modifications were made and the aircraft redesignated the SAB-SEMA 12. This was a single-bay biplane with N-form interplane struts.  The lower wing had a smaller chord than the upper one but both carried ailerons, externally connected. The fuselage was flat sided and the tailplane was mounted on top of it.  The fin was tall and the rudder extended to the bottom of the fuselage, moving between separate elevators. It had a conventional undercarriage with mainwheels in spats.

Operational history
In October 1936 the SAB-SEMA 12 was sold to the Spanish Republican Air Force for use as a trainer for military pilots in the Spanish Civil War. It was based at the Los Alcázares flying school in Murcia.

Variants
SAB-SEMA 10
Competitor for trainer contract, with Lorraine 7M Mizar engine.
SAB-SEMA 12
Modified SAB-SEMA 10 with Lorraine 9Na Algol engine and wing and tail modifications.

Operators

Spanish Republican Air Force

Specifications (SAB-SEMA-12)

See also

References

1930s French military trainer aircraft
Société Aérienne Bordelaise
Biplanes
Single-engined tractor aircraft
Aircraft first flown in 1933